The Dijon Congress was the twentieth national congress of the French Socialist Party (Parti socialiste or PS). It took place from May 16 to 18, 2003.

The objective of the Congress was to start the reconstruction of the weakened party after its shocking defeat in the 2002 French presidential election.

Results 

François Hollande was re-elected as First Secretary.

References

Congresses of the Socialist Party (France)
François Hollande
2003 in France
2003 in politics
2003 conferences
May 2003 events in France